Naboth was a citizen of Jezreel. According to the Book of Kings in the Hebrew Bible, he was executed by Queen Jezebel so that her husband Ahab could possess his vineyard.

Narrative
1 Kings 21:1-16 states that Naboth owned a vineyard, in proximity to King Ahab's palace in the city of Jezreel. Because of this, Ahab desired to acquire the vineyard so that he could use it for a vegetable (or herb) garden.  Since he inherited the land from his ancestors, Naboth refused to sell it to Ahab. According to the Mosaic law, the law forbade the permanent selling of land. 

Frustrated at not being able to procure the vineyard, Ahab returned to his palace and went to bed without eating anything. His wife, Jezebel, after learning the reason for his being upset, asked mockingly, "Are you not the king?" She then said that she would obtain the vineyard for him. To do so, she sent a letter, under Ahab's name, to the elders and nobles of Naboth's city, instructing them to entrap Naboth by inviting him to a religious feast, where he would be 'exalted'. Two witnesses, referred to as "scoundrels" by Jezebel, were then to be called forth to (falsely) accuse Naboth of cursing God and the king. After that, they would take him outside the city and stone him to death. The use of two witnesses in this conspiracy was most likely done to convince the elders and nobles that they were participating in a legal entrapment against a guilty person, instead of a criminal conspiracy as the testimonies of two witnesses were enough to impose the death penalty on the accused.

The conspiracy succeeded, with Naboth's corpse being licked by dogs outside of the city. Emil G. Hirsch points out that "It seems from II Kings ix. 26 that Naboth's sons perished with their father, probably being killed soon afterward by order of Jezebel in order that they might not claim the vineyard as their inheritance." After Naboth was executed, the Queen told Ahab to take possession of the vineyard. 

As punishment for this incident, the prophet Elijah visited Ahab and prophesied his death and the extermination of the Omride line. Elijah also prophesied the death of Jezebel. Ahab humbled himself at Elijah's words, and God spared the king accordingly, instead postponing the prophesied destruction of Ahab's house to his son's reign. Johannes Pedersen said that "The story teaches us that the king is bound to respect the proprietary rights of families..." According to Rabbanic Literature, Naboth's soul was the lying spirit that was permitted to deceive Ahab to his death. Elijah's prophecy on the doom of Ahab's house was fulfilled when Jehu executed Ahab's son Jehoram by shooting him in the back with an arrow, and had his body thrown into the field of Naboth the Jezreelite, as punishment for his parents' sin in illegally stealing Naboth's land. Jezebel met a similar fate after she was thrown off a building, with her corpse devoured by dogs.

Interpretations

Archaeological exploration conducted by the University of Haifa and the University of Evansville discovered an ancient winery in the vicinity of an Iron Age IIB (900–700 B.C.E.) military enclosure at the foot of Tel Jezreel. While not definitely identifying the site as the location for the story of Naboth, archaeologist Dr. Norma Franklin, of the University of Haifa said that the vineyard appears to have been established sometime prior to 300 BCE, which would not be inconsistent with the time frame for Naboth. Franklin further noted, "Owning a vineyard would make him wealthy since wine was an important commodity. I reckon that since he was from the aristocracy he probably lived in Samaria and had more than one vineyard. This would give a slightly different picture than the Bible, which implies, though does not state explicitly, that he was a poor man being abused by the wealthy king."

Francis Andersen observed that "Commentators have seen in the episode a clash of Israelite and Canaanite ideas of kingship, of citizenship, and of property."

Jewish medieval scholars sometimes used Elijah's words to Ahab "You have killed and also taken possession" ("הֲרָצַחְתָּ וְגַם יָרָשְׁתָּ") or the expression "Naboth's vineyard" to hint at double injustice (or crime committed with indecency, as opposed to "simply committed" crime). The Talmud also sees here a link to the prohibition of mixtures of milk and meat in Jewish law.

Roger Williams, the founder of the American colony of Rhode Island and the co-founder of the First Baptist Church in America, wrote about Naboth's story in The Bloudy Tenent of Persecution for Cause of Conscience as an example of how God disfavored Christians from using government force in religious matters, such as the religious decrees by Jezebel and Ahab. Williams believed using force in the name of religion would lead to political persecution contrary to the Bible.

In popular culture

There are a number of artistic, dramatic, musical and literary works that are based on, or inspired by, the story of Naboth and his vineyard. These are less common now than was once the case, as the use of the expression as a cultural reference appears to have declined.

Art
The 17th century Baroque pulpit in the late Gothic church of Sint Michiel, Roeselare in Belgium depicts the story of Naboth's Vineyard.

Naboth in his Vineyard, (1856) an oil painting by James Smetham held by Tate Britain.

Elijah confronting Ahab and Jezebel in Naboth’s Vineyard, (1875) by Sir Frank Dicksee, a gold medal winner from the Royal Academy. The original is untraced since having been sold at auction in 1919 from the collection of Sir Merton Russell-Cotes; the British Museum holds a black & white print.

King Ahab's Coveting – Naboth Refuses Ahab his Vineyard, (1879) and Jezebel Promises Ahab to Obtain it by False Witness, (1879) both by Thomas Matthews Rooke (Sir Edward Burne-Jones's studio assistant), and held by the Russell-Cotes Art Gallery & Museum, Bournemouth.

Novels and short stories
Naboth (1886, in book form 1891), by Rudyard Kipling; Kipling sympathises with Ahab, and treats Naboth as being unreasonable in refusing his demands.

Naboth's Vineyard. A novel (1891), by E Œ Somerville and Martin Ross (Somerville and Ross).

Naboth’s Vineyard (1928), a short horror story by the English novelist EF Benson.

Naboth's Vineyard (1928), a detective short story by Melville Davisson Post.

Poetry
Naboth's Vineyard: Or, The Innocent Traytor, (1679) a mock-Biblical verse satire by the Jacobite peer John Caryll whilst imprisoned in the Tower of London.

The Garden Plot, (1709) a sonnet by the Anglo-Irish satirist Jonathan Swift.

Naboth, the Jezreelite, (1844) a dramatic poem by Anne Flinders (the daughter of the explorer Matthew Flinders and the mother of the Egyptologist Flinders Petrie).

Music
Naboth, (1702) an oratorio by Domenico Filippo Bottari.

Sinfonia a quattro No 11 in D minor ("Naboth"), (1729) a symphony by the Italian Baroque composer Antonio Caldara.

Naboth's Weinbert, (1781) an oratorio by Romano Reutter.

Naboth's Vineyard, (1968) a madrigal for three voices, forming the first part of a trilogy by the English composer Alexander Goehr.

La vigne de Naboth: pièce en cinq actes et un épilogue, (1981) by the Belgian composer André Laporte.

Naboth's Vineyard, (1983) a work for recorders, cello and harpsichord by the English composer Malcolm Lipkin.

Custodian – An Ex Parte Oratorio, (2018) a protest oratorio for an a cappella choir by the Israeli composer Uri Agnon combining the stories of Naboth's Vineyard and the eviction of the Palestinian Sumreen family from their home in Silwan.

Theatre
Naboth's Vineyard; a stage piece, (1925) a play in three acts by the English novelist and playwright Clemence Dane.

La Vigne de Nabot, (lost date) a piece of black theatre (a form of puppetry making use of shadows) by the French puppeteer Georges Lafaye (puppeteer).

Eating, (1979) a retelling of the story of Naboth, focusing on the gluttony of Ahab, by the Israeli playwright Yaakov Shabtai.

Ballet
Naboth's Vineyard (1953), a ballet by the Austrian-born American composer Eric Zeisl, although it has not been produced or choreographed in full.

Film
Sins of Jezebel, (1953) a drama film directed by the Austrian-born American director Reginald Le Borg; Ludwig Donath played Naboth.

Leviathan, (2014) a drama film directed by the Russian filmmaker Andrey Zvyagintsev, partly based on the story of Marvin Heemeyer, and partly on the Biblical stories of Job and Naboth's Vineyard.

Politics
Naboth’s Vineyard, (1870) a speech by the Congressman Charles Sumner strongly opposing President Ulysses S. Grant’s proposed annexation of the Dominican Republic (then called San Domingo).

Lt Gen Sir William Butler undertook a visit of South Africa in 1907 and reported his findings as From Naboth’s Vineyard.

See also
 Legal plunder

References

Further reading 

 
 
 
 
 Andersen, F. I. (1966). The socio-juridical background of the Naboth incident. Journal of Biblical Literature, 85(1), 46-57.
 Beach, E. F. (2005). The Jezebel letters: Religion and politics in ninth-century Israel. Fortress Press.
 
 
 Ben-Barak, Z. (1981). Meribaal and the system of land grants in ancient Israel. Biblica, 62(1), 73-91.
 
 
 
 
 
 
 
 
 
 
 Franklin, N., Ebeling, J. R., Guillaume, P., & Appler, D. (2017). Have we found Naboth's vineyard at Jezreel? Biblical archaeology review, 43(6), 49-54.
 
 
 Gora, Kennedy. (2008). Postcolonial readings of 1 Kings 21: 1-29 within the context of the struggle for land in Zimbabwe: from colonialism to liberalism to liberation, to the present (Doctoral dissertation).
 
 
 
 
 
 Huizenga, Kirk. (2013). Exegetical analysis 1 Kings 21:1-16. Phoenix Seminary. Phoenix, Arizona. via Academia
 Isager, Signe, and Bilde, Per. (1990). Kings and gods in the Seleucid empire. A question of landed property in Asia Minor. Religion and religious practice in the Seleucid kingdom, 79-90.
 
 
 Kitz, A. M. (2015). Naboth's vineyard after Mari and Amarna. Journal of Biblical Literature, 134(3), 529-545.
 
 
 
 
 
 
 
 
 
 
 
 
 
 
 
 
 
 
 
 
  
 
 
 
 
 
 
 
 
 
 
 
 
 
 
 
 
 
 
 
 
 Williamson, H. G. M. (2007). The Stories about Naboth the Jezreelite: A Source, Composition, and Redaction Investigation of 1 Kings 21 and Passages in 2 Kings 9.
 
 
 

Biblical murder victims
9th-century BCE Hebrew people
Books of Kings people
Elijah
Deaths by stoning
People executed for blasphemy
Male murder victims